Yuliya Antipova (* 14 July 1966) is a Soviet luger who competed in the late 1980s and early 1990s. She won three medals at the FIL World Luge Championships, including one silver (Women's singles: 1990) and two bronzes (Mixed team: 1989, 1990).

Antipova also finished fifth in the women's singles event at the 1988 Winter Olympics in Calgary.

She was overall Luge World Cup champion in women's singles twice (1987-8, 1989–90).

References
1988 luge women's singles results
1988 Winter Olympics Top six finishers 
Hickok sports information on World champions in luge and skeleton.
List of women's singles luge World Cup champions since 1978.
SportQuick.com information on World champions in luge 

Living people
Lugers at the 1988 Winter Olympics
Russian female lugers
Soviet female lugers
1966 births
Olympic lugers of the Soviet Union